Henry Carl Berghoff (January 6, 1856 – June 28, 1925) was a German-American politician, lawyer, and businessman who cofounded the Herman Berghoff Brewing Company and served as the 19th Mayor of Fort Wayne, Indiana from May 9, 1901 to January 10, 1906.

Berghoff was born January 6, 1856, in Dortmund, Germany, and immigrated to the United States in 1872, settling in Fort Wayne, Indiana.  He, along with his brothers, also recent immigrants, founded the Herman Berghoff Brewing Company, which served Berghoff's Beer, in 1887, and in 1888, they opened their first Berghoff Brewery in Fort Wayne.  Henry Berghoff became involved within helped establish various local businesses throughout his life, and also became involved with local Democratic politics in Fort Wayne, serving in various local political offices from 1885 to 1901, and mounting an unsuccessful campaign for Indiana State Treasurer in 1890.  In 1893, he assisted the county sheriff in putting down a local riot. 

In 1901, Berghoff received the Democratic nomination for mayor of Fort Wayne, and after a campaign in which his opponents criticized his German background, was elected mayor of Fort Wayne, and took office after being sworn in on May 9 of that year.  As mayor, Berghoff delivered a rousing speech praising German contributions to America at the 1901 Indiana District Turnfest, presided over the opening of the first electric interurban railroad (as well as at least three other railroads throughout the duration of his mayoralty) in Fort Wayne in 1901, the completion and dedication of the current Allen County Courthouse in 1902, the completion of the South Wayne Sewer in 1902, a typhoid epidemic from 1903 to 1904, signed General Ordinance 223, which granted a 31-year municipal franchise to the Fort Wayne Electric Light and Power company, and appointed the first Fort Wayne Board of Parks Commissioners in 1905. During Berghoff's mayoralty, more work was done on public works than in prior years, the cases of communicable diseases fell by over 300, gambling devices were banned from public places, there were no losses in litigation by the Fort Wayne Law Department from 1903 to 1905, and a balance of over $130,000 was attained for the city of Fort Wayne.  However, Berghoff came under controversy for his handling of an impending water famine in 1901, after ordering that a canal basin flow into Fort Wayne's main water supply for ten hours (in order to give the city a larger water supply), which caused the pollution of the city's water. Berghoff also came under controversy for refusal to approve the bond, on the grounds that the appointment was not legitimate, of Robert B. Dreibelbiss for his appointment by Governor Winfield T. Durbin to the Fort Wayne Municipal (Police) Court, however, the appointment was held as valid by the Indiana Supreme Court in 1902. In 1905, Berghoff founded the German-American National Bank, later renamed to the Lincoln National Bank due to anti-German sentiments during World War I. In late 1905, Berghoff received a Democratic nomination for City Councilman-at-large, however, he lost in the general election. Berghoff left office on January 10, 1906, after serving one four and a half year term as mayor of Fort Wayne (the only mayor of Fort Wayne to do so). 

After his mayoralty, Berghoff returned to work in the Berghoff Brewery, and various other local businesses, for the rest of his life. Berghoff died on June 28, 1925, in Fort Wayne, after suffering an apoplectic stroke, survived by his wife and several children.

Early life (1856 - 1883) 

Henry Carl Berghoff was born January 6, 1856, in Dortmund, Germany (then Prussia), the son of Franz Anton and Lizette (Boelhauve) Berghoff. Henry had five brothers (Theodor, Anton, Herman, Hubert, and Gustav) and one sister (Elizabeth). In Dortmund, Henry received a high school education, and held a job at a bank. In 1872, Henry immigrated to the United States, and settled in Fort Wayne, Indiana. Berghoff chose to settle in Fort Wayne supposedly after he was offered a job there when the train he was aboard made a stop in the city. During the next few years after his arrival in the United States, he held a range of jobs as a clerk and a bookkeeper, and he also studied law. In 1877, Henry married Theresa Mayer.

Business and political career (1883 - 1901)

Business career 
In 1883, Berghoff and his brother Herman bought East End Bottling Works, a bottling company in Fort Wayne. In 1887, Henry and three of his brothers who had immigrated to the United States, Herman, Hubert, and Gustav, established the Herman Berghoff Brewing Company in Fort Wayne. Throughout the rest of his life, Henry served as secretary, vice president, and treasurer of the business. The brand of beer Henry and his brothers sold under the Herman Berghoff Brewing Company was known as “Berghoff’s Beer.” In 1888, the brothers opened their first Berghoff Brewery in Fort Wayne. At the brewery, Berghoff’s Beer was brewed and sold. On August 22, the brothers experienced a setback when the brewery caught fire, resulting in $50,000 dollars in damages.  Brewing resumed exactly a month later. In 1892, Gustav purchased Summit City Bottle Works, where Henry served as vice president. In 1898, Herman opened a restaurant called The Berghoff, in Chicago, where it is still open today. The restaurant served Berghoff’s Beer. Around this time, the name of the brother’s brewing company was changed to the “Berghoff Brewing Company.” 

Henry also entered into a partnership with Artificial Ice Company, was the proprietor of Globe Spice Mills, and was the treasurer of Phoenix Building and Savings Union.

Early political career 
Berghoff, a Democrat, served as treasurer of Fort Wayne for three terms, from 1885 to 1891. In 1890, he ran for Indiana State Treasurer, but lost to businessman Albert Gall. On Memorial Day in 1893, Fort Wayne railway workers went on strike, demanding their pay be increased from thirteen and a half cents an hour to fifteen cents an hour. The workers quickly resorted to rioting. Sheriff E. F. Clausmeier appointed multiple civilians to the position of deputy sheriff to assist him in putting down the disturbances, among them Henry Berghoff.  On June 2, Berghoff spoke at the meeting that was held to review measures to put down the riots. The rioting ended that day after the strikers’ demands of wage increase were met. Berghoff returned to politics in 1896, serving as comptroller of Fort Wayne for two terms, from then until 1901.

1901 Fort Wayne mayoral election 
In April 1901, Berghoff received the Democratic nomination for mayor of Fort Wayne. The other nominees for mayor were Republican Charles Reese and Socialist Martin H. Wefel. The 1901 Fort Wayne Mayoral Election was very heated. During this time, Americans held unfavorable views towards Kaiser Wilhelm II and the German Empire, and so Berghoff was harshly criticized for his German birth by some leading Fort Wayne Republicans, and consequently, they were accused of xenophobia by members of the Democratic Party. Despite the criticism of his heritage, Berghoff won the May 7, 1901 general election with 5176 of the 9209 votes cast. He was sworn in two days later.

Mayor of Fort Wayne (1901 - 1906)

Beginning of 1901 
Berghoff, who succeeded Henry P. Scherer, served as mayor of Fort Wayne from May 9, 1901 to January 10, 1906. Throughout his mayoralty, Berghoff, along with other city officials, annually wrote messages to the Common Council of Fort Wayne, informing them on the business and financial situation of the city. Immediately after taking office as mayor of Fort Wayne on May 9, 1901, Berghoff appointed W. H. Shambaugh as city attorney, Joseph Fox as comptroller, and Peter Eggeman, William Doehrmann, and Henry C. Zollinger as members of the Board of Public Works.

1901 Indiana District Turnfest 
On June 15, 1901, the biennial Indiana District Turnfest (a German gymnastic festival) was held in Fort Wayne. Over 3000 people, from Indiana, Illinois, Ohio, and Kentucky, of German and Anglo descent, attended the event. Berghoff delivered a rousing speech at the event, praising Germans for their contributions to America, saying, “The Germans have done more toward the progress and up-building of this country in every avenue of commerce, of art, and of learning, than any or all other peoples on earth, and every intelligent American will admit it.” Berghoff, proud “in being a German,” emboldened the audience, whom he referred to as “we Germans in America,” to not forget their “mother tongue,” to preserve “the customs of their fathers,” and that they “may well feel proud of our nation.” Berghoff, after stating “we need not be ashamed of our ancestry,” criticized those who avoided demonstrations of their German heritage: “Such do not deserve the name of Germans.” Berghoff claimed that a minimum of two thirds of Fort Wayne citizens were German, and believed this indicated that second and third generation German-Americans still harbored their German identity. At the close of the Turnfest, The Journal Gazette claimed, “It will go down in history as the most successful ever held in the Indiana district.” Berghoff’s identification as a German, instead of a German American, strengthened the image of Fort Wayne as an exemplar of ethnic acceptance. Berghoff attained success without forgoing the cultural elements of his heritage or his ethnicity. The following was Mayor Berghoff’s speech at Turnfest:

Aversion of a water famine and rest of 1901 
According to Berghoff in his Annual Message at the end of 1901 and his Annual Message at the end of 1902, the first problem his mayoral administration encountered was, in July 1901, the likelihood of a water famine in Fort Wayne, after a fire destroyed the city’s reservoir. Berghoff stated that he consulted with experts and local businessmen on what should be done to prevent the impending water famine, and, according to Berghoff, they decided on increasing the pump capacity of Fort Wayne’s two water plants. A new air plant was installed at the first water plant, and a new 6 million gallon pump was installed at the second water plant. Additionally, Berghoff ordered that the water from a canal basin flow into the main supply of the city’s water for ten hours, in order to give the city a larger supply of water. As a result of these new installations, he believed, “the needs of the city for many years to come” would be supplied (six or seven million gallons of water would be pumped through the two water plants a day, and 140 gallons of water a day would be pumped for each Fort Wayne citizen). However, Berghoff and his administration came under scrutiny after the water from the canal basin polluted the city’s water. He accepted the blame for the pollution, arguing that the need for more water because of an impending of a water famine had justified his actions. 

Berghoff also advocated for the use of water meters in Fort Wayne, in order to cut down on the excessive use of water so that Fort Wayne would only need one water plant instead of two to supply Fort Wayne citizens with water. He also endorsed charging consumers seven cents per 1000 gallons of water, stating it would cut down the cost of water for an average Fort Wayne citizen to less than half of the then-current flat rates.

A major event in Berghoff’s mayoralty occurred in September 1901, when the first electric interurban railway in Fort Wayne, the Fort Wayne and Northern Indiana Traction Company line, was opened. This helped establish Fort Wayne as an important center of freight and passenger traffic in the Midwest. 

At the end of 1901 in his Annual Message, Berghoff stated that since the beginning of his mayoralty in May, not one charge had been filed against the Fort Wayne Fire Department, praising it as “one of the best in the state.” Berghoff also praised the Health Department, as the death rate for contagious diseases in Fort Wayne that year was just over 1.2 percent. He also advised the Health Department to prepare for possible diphtheria, smallpox, and cholera epidemics in the city.

State, ex. rel., v. Berghoff 
In April 1902, the Indiana State Supreme Court, ruling against Berghoff in State, ex. rel., v. Berghoff, declared valid the appointment made by Indiana Governor Winfield T. Durbin of Robert B. Dreibelbiss, a Republican, as judge of the Fort Wayne Municipal (Police) Court, after the previous judge, George W. Louttit, a Democrat, had been removed from the bench on the grounds that the office had been created two days after his (Louttit’s) election to the position. Berghoff, believing the grounds for Louttit’s removal were unconstitutional and illegitimate, refused to approve Dreibelbiss’ official bond required by law to serve as judge of the Fort Wayne Municipal (Police) Court. In the Indiana Circuit Court, Berghoff’s opinion was upheld, although upon further review in the Indiana Supreme Court, it was decided the governor’s appointment was valid, as mentioned earlier.

Allen County Courthouse 

Berghoff also presided over the completion of the construction of the current Allen County Courthouse in Fort Wayne in 1902. The construction of the courthouse costed, in total, $817,553.59, which would be $250 million today. The construction of the courthouse began on November 17, 1897, during the mayoralty of Berghoff’s predecessor, Henry P. Scherer. The courthouse was built by architect Brentwood S. Tolan.

The courthouse, a Beaux-Arts architecture-style and historicist-style building, is structurally made of steel, and it’s facade consists of both Vermont granite and Bedford, Indiana limestone. The interior staircases, balustrades, and walls are made of white Carrara marble. The interior contains what is possibly the largest example of scagliola worldwide. The courthouse was constructed in Grecian, Roman, and Renaissance styles, with Doric lines on the first floor, Ionic columns on the second floor, and Corinthian and Roman Imperial styles on the third floor. The floor tiles of the courthouse are encaustic. The ceilings of the courthouse are stenciled in varied patterns on ceilings and cornices, along with plaster moldings covered with gold, aluminum, and copper leaf. The interior consists of four 25 x 45 foot murals by Charles Holloway. In the murals situated in the rotunda, Law, Justice, and Mercy are depicted, and in the courtroom, the Battle of Fallen Timbers and Byzantine Emperor Justinian the Great are depicted. Sculptures of historical figures, including Chief Little Turtle, Samuel Hanna, John Allen, and others are present inside and outside the courthouse. Other sculptures contain stories of arts and industry, war and peace, and law and order. The courthouse measures 238.52 feet in height, and on the top of it is situated a dome, which looms 110 feet over the main rotunda. The dome also contains stained glass windows. On top of the courthouse dome is a 13.5 foot tall, copper-sheathed weather vane in the form of the Goddess of Liberty.

On September 23, 1902, the Allen County Courthouse was dedicated, and Berghoff was present at the courthouse’s dedication ceremonies. Governor Winfield T. Durbin attended the dedication ceremonies, and President Theodore Roosevelt was scheduled to attend the dedication ceremonies.

The courthouse would go on to be added to the National Register of Historic Places in 1976, and became a National Historic Landmark in 2002.

Rest of 1902 
During Berghoff’s mayoralty, sometime in 1902, postal sub-stations were established in Fort Wayne for the first time.  All of the sub-stations were located in drugstores.  

Also during Berghoff’s mayoralty in 1902, the Fort Wayne Fair association was established. 

Berghoff, in his Annual Message at the end of 1902, remarked on the Fort Wayne Gas Company, warning that if it failed to supply enough gas for the city, an action should be taken for Fort Wayne to forfeit the company’s franchise, which had first been granted to the company's predecessor, the Salamonie Gas and Mining Company, by the Fort Wayne City Council in 1888. He also noted that, for the first time in history, the Fort Wayne Fire Department had kept its expenditures under its yearly budget. On matters of morality, Berghoff stated that, from the beginning of his mayoralty, he had aimed to restrict immorality and crime as much as possible in Fort Wayne. He also stated actions he had taken since to achieve this aim, including ordering the removal of wine rooms from saloons, the prohibition of those of bad character from entering those places, and the removal of notorious places from Fort Wayne’s business district. Berghoff also ordered the removal of gambling devices from public places in Fort Wayne. He stated that street car extensions for the Interurban Railway would be built as needed throughout Fort Wayne, and that a lower fare and better service in the Interurban Railway would be promised as well. Berghoff also considered the idea of Fort Wayne possessing its own heating plant. He also touted the Fort Wayne parks, commending the improvements made to Swinney Park, and arguing that Williams Park should be acquired by the city. Berghoff also described his policy on street improvements (which had been restricted by the City Council of Fort Wayne earlier in 1902) thus: “I believe that street improvements should be made whenever the people along the streets and the general public ask for them.” He believed that Fort Wayne should be as progressive in its public works as other cities, in order to retain its status “as the second best city in the state” of Indiana. Berghoff also remarked on the city’s contagious disease hospital in his Annual Message, stating his administration had put the hospital in the most healthful condition possible. Berghoff also advocated, unsuccessfully, for the replacement of this hospital with a new one, as he would reiterate years afterward. Berghoff also advocated for a rule to be adopted “that demands all patients who want assistance from the city go to this hospital and the city will take care of them.” However, he said, if they chose not to take these steps, they would be quarantined in their homes and would be complied to pay all expenses for medical care while sick in their houses, which, Berghoff said, would prevent the Fort Wayne Health Department from unnecessary expenses. Berghoff also stated he would strictly enforce a rule that all horse manure be put in an iron container and disposed of when full. This was, Berghoff said, in order to keep the streets of Fort Wayne sanitary.

The Intercepting and South Wayne sewers 
In his Annual Message at the end of 1902, Berghoff forcefully defended the Intercepting Sewer and the positive differences he believed it made for the city of Fort Wayne. The construction of the Intercepting Sewer was begun in 1900, under the mayoralty of his predecessor, Henry P. Scherer, and was finished before Berghoff took office. It was built to comply with Indiana sanitation laws, and construction costed $162,397.57. The Fort Wayne Board of Public Works, during Berghoff’s mayoralty, approved the plans for the construction of the sewer made by the previous board. Some Fort Wayne citizens criticized the sewer, calling it “a useless expenditure of money” and “not a public necessity.” Berghoff, however, believed it to be an improvement to the city, stating, “The sewer is doing the work it was intended to do.” The Intercepting Sewer purified the St. Mary’s River and transported the house sewage to half a mile outside Fort Wayne. Thus, he remarked, on the cost and effectiveness of the sewer, “The improved condition is worth double the cost of the improvement.” Berghoff also affirmed, because of the improvements the new sewer brought, “It can be truthfully said that the city of Fort Wayne and the city of Indianapolis are the only two cities in the state of Indiana that have almost perfect sanitary drainage.”

Berghoff also discussed the South Wayne Sewer in his 1902 Annual Message, and officially announced its completion. The initiative to construct the South Wayne sewer begun, like the Intercepting Sewer, under Mayor Henry P. Scherer. During its construction, work on the sewer was abandoned for two months by the original contractor, and, as a result, some of the work became defective, and the defective portions of the sewer had to be redone. Lateral drains attached to the sewer were also constructed, so, in the words of Berghoff, “the people could have the benefit of this outlet.” The South Wayne Sewer, which he believed “ought to have been constructed several years before,” was, like the Intercepting Sewer, heavily criticized. He hailed the South Wayne Sewer as being “first-class in every respect,” and in his Annual Message at the end of 1903, Berghoff commended it as having “gave relief as an outlet to the whole of South Wayne, as well as the territory in the southern, southwestern and western part of the city.” In his annual message at the end of 1903, Berghoff remarked on the effectiveness of the Intercepting and South Wayne Sewers, saying, “It was thought that the building of the Intercepting and South Wayne Sewers would bankrupt the city, but when the work was completed and the purposes of them enjoyed, the people ceased to complain.” Because of this, he affirmed, the cleanliness of Fort Wayne had been greatly improved.

1903 
Sometime in 1903, during Berghoff’s mayoralty, the Fort Wayne Rolling Mills were established. Two hundred and fifty workmen were brought from Chicago to be employed there when the mills opened. 

In Berghoff’s Annual Message at the end of 1903, he stated more work had been done for public works than ever before (that year, more than 4.16 miles of street improvements had been made, nine and a half miles of sewer laid, public bridges were repaired and painted, and the Garbage Crematory that had burned down). 

Berghoff, also in his Annual Message, asserted that “Fort Wayne is comparatively free from crime.”

Fort Wayne typhoid fever outbreak 
In November 1903, water contaminated with typhoid bacteria from the St. Marys River entered Fort Wayne’s main water supply, causing an outbreak of typhoid fever in Fort Wayne. However, it was not until February 1904 that the City Health Commissioner, Dr. A. H. Macbeth, alerted the public about the presence of typhoid bacteria in their drinking water. Despite there being over 80 new cases of typhoid fever in Fort Wayne, The Journal Gazette defended him, instead putting the blame for the typhoid fever outbreak on Republican waterworks trustees who had taken charge of the water plant in 1903. However, journalist Jesse Greene, writing in The Fort Wayne Sentinel, stated that a 1900 city ordinance required the health commissioner, and not the waterworks trustees, to run weekly tests on the city’s water. Greene also called on Berghoff to demand Macbeth’s resignation, which Berghoff did not do. On March 26, 1904, Berghoff announced to Fort Wayne citizens that their drinking water was safe to drink again. In the statement, Berghoff chose not to blame anyone, most notably the Republican waterworks officials, for the typhoid fever outbreak.

Municipal Lighting 
Berghoff had been in favor of constructing a municipal lighting plant (which the city of Fort Wayne would own and operate) throughout his political career, believing it to be Fort Wayne’s most important priority (at the time, it was considered a popular idea among Fort Wayne citizens to construct a municipal lighting plant for Fort Wayne). However, during the first years of his mayoralty, he had gradually changed his position, and in 1903, decided against the construction of a municipal plant, instead opting for a privately owned corporation to be the city’s main lighting supply, stating, “there is so much corruption in American cities that public utilities can be more economically managed by private corporations.” On February 12, 1904, Berghoff, with the approval of the Fort Wayne City Council, signed General Ordinance 223, which granted a 31-year contract for a municipal lighting franchise to the Fort Wayne Electric Light and Power company, a private corporation. The Fort Wayne Sentinel criticized his actions as having “broke faith with the people.” However, the Fort Wayne News praised the new franchise, stating, “its work will meet the entire approval of the people,” and that a majority of the people supported the franchise. The Fort Wayne News also stated their belief that the then-current cost of electricity would be less under the franchise.

Berghoff gave the following message after he approved General Ordinance 223, which granted a franchise to Fort Wayne Electric Light and Power company:

The construction of a municipal lighting plant was later begun in 1906, and the plant was opened in 1908, all during the mayoralty of Berghoff’s successor, William J. Hosey.

Rest of 1904 
On July 14, 1904, Berghoff addressed the Indiana State Bar Association at its eighth annual meeting held in Fort Wayne, where he was hailed as “the best mayor of the best city in America” by the association’s president, Willliam P. Breen. 

Sometime in 1904, under Berghoff’s mayoralty, a short railway in Fort Wayne, the Lake Erie and Fort Wayne Belt Line Railway, was opened. 

At the end of 1904, in his Annual Message, Berghoff reflected on all that he had accomplished during his the past three and a half years of his mayoralty, which would end in just over a year, as well as his accomplishments in 1904. 

Berghoff stated that, in 1904, more work was done for public works in Fort Wayne than any year before (five new miles of street, two miles of cement sidewalks, one and a half mile of brick sidewalks, five and a half miles of sewer were laid, and thirty new street lights were constructed, as well as a good amount of alley paving and street grading), even more than the previous year. 

He also stated that, in 1904, for the first time in Fort Wayne history, not one charge was made against any officer of the Fort Wayne Fire Department.

On legal matters, Berghoff stated that the Fort Wayne Department of Law had suffered no litigation losses in the previous two years.

Berghoff stated that the cases of communicable diseases had fallen from 374 cases to 52 cases in the past four years. Berghoff also called for a new contagious disease hospital to be constructed in Fort Wayne, as he had years before, noting the condition of the then-current hospital, stating, “In our present age, where humane principles are advocated by all, this kind of building should no longer be tolerated.” 

On fiscal matters, Berghoff stated that Fort Wayne had a net saving of and a balance on hand of $133,447.54. He also asserted that, “For the first time in the history of the city government have public funds been placed to draw interest for the public benefit.” Berghoff also advised tax assessors to keep watch for tax evasion, so that taxes in the city could “be more justly distributed.”

1905 
In 1905, Berghoff assisted in the creation of the German-American National Bank, where he served as head cashier. During World War I, it was renamed to “Lincoln National Bank" due to anti-German sentiments. 

In February 1905, under Berghoff’s mayoralty, the Fort Wayne Clearing House was established by representatives of the financial institutions in the city. The founding institutions of the clearing house passed their financial exchanges through it each business day. 

In April 1905, Berghoff appointed the first Fort Wayne Board of Park Commissioners. 

Sometime in 1905, under Berghoff's mayoralty, the Fort Wayne Hotel Company was established. 

Also sometime in 1905, the Fort Wayne and Northwestern Traction Line, a railroad, was opened in Fort Wayne, and on September 22 of that year, another railroad, the Ohio Electric Traction Line was opened. 

That same year, the gas supply of the Fort Wayne Natural Gas Company was exhausted, as Berghoff had warned years before in his Annual Message at the end of 1902. The gas service of the Fort Wayne Natural Gas Company was ended in November 1905.

Run for City Councilman-at-large 
Berghoff, deciding against running for re-election, chose to pursue the Democratic nomination for City Councilman-at-large in September 1905. Five at-large seats were up for election, and thus five candidates from each party were nominated. He received one of the nominations. Berghoff’s candidacy was heavily criticized by the News Sentinel. Municipal elections, including the election for mayor, were held on November 7, 1905, and Berghoff lost the general election, receiving 3,876 votes, which were the third least.

In the 1905 mayoral election, Berghoff, choosing not to seek re-election, endorsed Democratic City Councilman William J. Hosey, who won the election. Hosey received 6157 votes, with his opponent, Republican Edward White, receiving 4881 votes. At the end of 1905, Mayor-elect Hosey wrote the Annual Mayor's Message, instead of Berghoff, who was the incumbent mayor at the time.

1906 
Berghoff, after serving one four and a half year term as mayor (the only mayor of Fort Wayne to do so), left office on January 10, 1906, and was succeeded by William J. Hosey. Before leaving office, Berghoff warned Hosey that the mayoralty was no "bed of roses."

Later life and death (1906 - 1925) 
After serving as mayor of Fort Wayne, and losing election for City Councilman-at-large, Berghoff left politics for good, and instead returned to business. Berghoff held positions at Wayne Oil Tank and continued to serve as vice president of Summit City Bottle Works, renamed to “Rub-No-More Soap Company” in 1912, subsequent to his mayoralty. Also subsequent to his mayoralty, Henry had more time to pay attention to the Berghoff Brewery in Fort Wayne. In 1909, a year after Hubert stepped down as vice president and manager of the Berghoff Brewing Company due to poor health, the company was reorganized, and its name was changed to the “Berghoff Brewing Association.” On April 12, 1918, Prohibition began in Indiana, and production of Berghoff’s Beer was halted. The Berghoff Brewing Association was renamed to “Berghoff Products” and “Brewers of Bergo Soft Drinks.” Berghoff never lived to see the end of Prohibition in 1933, when alcoholic beer was brewed at the Berghoff Brewery once again. Berghoff died aged 69 on June 28, 1925 in Fort Wayne, Indiana, after suffering an apoplectic stroke three days before.

Personal life and family 

Berghoff styled his silver hair in a Bismarckian fashion, and also had a distinguished moustache. He ended all his speeches by saying “God Bless the brave founders of our state.”

Berghoff, a Catholic, was a member of St. Mary's Catholic Church, the Holy Name Society, the Knights of Columbus, and the Catholic Knights of America.

Berghoff’s wife, Theresa Mayer (who survived her husband, dying in 1955 at the age of 99), was a daughter of Lorenz and Maria Mayer. Berghoff’s brothers Herman and Hubert, like Henry, both married daughters of Lorenz and Maria Mayer, while another Berghoff brother, Gustav, married Maria’s niece.

Berghoff's great-nephew was Aloysius Rumely, Jr., who served as mayor of La Porte, Indiana, from 1979 until his murder in 1982. Rumely was the son of Aloysius Rumely, Sr., the son of Meinrad Rumely, who founded Advance-Rumely. Aloysius Rumely, Jr.'s mother, Hannah Berghoff, was the daughter of Herman Berghoff, Henry's brother.

Berghoff's daughter, Elsie, was married to Edward C. Ehrman, the son of Edward J. Ehrman, who was a Fort Wayne City Councilman from 1898 to 1902.

Berghoff and his wife had eight children: Lawrence, Joseph, Carl, Frederick, Augustus, Raymond, Elsie, and Arthur.

Berghoff, his wife, and seven of their children are buried in Catholic Cemetery in Fort Wayne, Indiana.

See also 
 The Berghoff (Restaurant)
 List of Mayors of Fort Wayne

References

External links 
First Annual Message of Henry C. Berghoff, Mayor of Fort Wayne, Indiana with Annual Reports of Heads of Departments of the City Government for the Fiscal Year Ending December 31, 1901.

Second Annual Message of Henry C. Berghoff, Mayor of Ford Wayne, Indiana with Annual Reports of Heads of Departments of the City Government for the Fiscal Year Ending December 31, 1902.

Third Annual Message of Henry C. Berghoff, Mayor of Fort Wayne, Indiana with Annual Reports of Heads of Departments of the City Government for the Fiscal Year Ending December 31, 1903.

Fourth Annual Message of Henry C. Berghoff, Mayor of Fort Wayne, Indiana with Annual Reports of Heads of Departments of the City Government for the Fiscal Year Ending December 31, 1904.

Mayors of Fort Wayne, Indiana
American people of German descent

1856 births
1925 deaths